Isen is a municipality in the district of Erding in Bavaria in Germany.

Isen has once been home to a Benedictine abbey. The abbey was dissolved however during the secularisation in 1802 so only the St. Zeno Church remains today.

In 1946 Isen had a population of 1,631.

Sources

Erding (district)